A charity regulator  is a regulatory agency that regulates the charitable or wider nonprofit sectors in it respective jurisdiction. They can also be referred to as commissions, although that term can also refer specifically to the non-tax policy regulation of charitable organizations.

Charity regulators take various forms, from small teams within taxation departments to standalone bodies.

Examples

Charity Commission for England and Wales
Charity Commission for Northern Ireland
Office of the Scottish Charity Regulator
Charities Regulator or An Rialálaí Carthanas (Ireland)
Gibraltar Charity Commissioners
Federal Republic of Germany Transparency Register
Public benefit organizations and NGOs at the Department of Social and Solidarity Economy (Poland)
The Foundation Authority (Norway)
Associations and foundations at the Finnish Patent and Registration Office
Registrars of Associations, Charitable Trusts, Endowments, Pledges, Companies (including public benefit companies), and more at the Corporations Authority (Israel) 
Punjab Charity Commission (Pakistan)
Chinese Ministry of Civil Affairs online database of social organizations
Inland Revenue Department (Hong Kong)
Commissioner of Charities (Singapore)
Charities Services (Ngā Ratonga Kaupapa Atawhai) (New Zealand)
Australian Charities and Not-For-Profits Commission
Charities Directorate of Canada (La Direction des Organismes de Bienfaisance)
Charities and Nonprofits at the United States Internal Revenue Service 
New York State Attorney General's Charities Bureau
California Attorney General's Registry of Charitable Trusts

See also
 Charitable trust
 Charity assessment

References

External links
 Charity Commission for England and Wales
 Charity Commission for Northern Ireland
 Office of the Scottish Charity Regulator
 Charites Regulator (Cuireadh an Rialálaí Carthanas) (Eire)
 Gibraltar Charity Commissioners
 Federal Republic of Germany Transparency Register
 Public benefit organizations and NGOs at the Department of Social and Solidarity Economy (Poland)
 The Foundation Authority (Norway)
 Associations and foundations at the Finnish Patent and Registration Office
 Punjab Charity Commission 
 Chinese Ministry of Civil Affairs online database of social organizations (Chinese)
 Inland Revenue Department (Hong Kong)
 Commissioner of Charities (Singapore)
 Charities Services (Ngā Ratonga Kaupapa Atawhai) (New Zealand)
 Australian Charities and Not-For-Profits Commission
 Charities Directorate of Canada (La Direction des Organismes de Bienfaisance)
 Charities and Nonprofits at the United States Internal Revenue Service
 New York State Attorney General's Charities Bureau
 California Attorney General's Registry of Charitable Trusts

 
Regulators